The 1997 FIVB Volleyball World League was the eighth edition of the annual men's international volleyball tournament, played by 12 countries from 16 May to 5 July 1997. The Final Round was held in Moscow, Russia.

Pools composition

Intercontinental round
The top two teams in each pool will qualify for the Final Round. If the Final Round hosts Russia finish lower than second in Pool C, they will still qualify along with the best two second teams across all three pools.

Pool A

|}

|}

Pool B

|}

|}

Pool C

|}

|}

Final round
Venue:  Olimpiyskiy Stadium, Moscow, Russia

Pool play
Teams from the same pool of Intercontinental Round will not play. Russia will be considered as the runners-up of Pool B.

|}

|}

Finals

3rd place match

|}

Final

|}

Final standing

Awards
MVP
  Guido Görtzen
Best Scorer
  Guido Görtzen
Best Spiker
  Bas van de Goor
Best Server
  Ramón Gato
Best Blocker
  Ihosvany Hernández

External links
1997 World League results
Sports123

1997
FIVB World League
Volleyball